Georgios Sideras (born 30 May 2002) is a Greek professional footballer who plays as a centre-back for Super League club Panathinaikos.

References

2002 births
Living people
Greek footballers
Super League Greece players
Super League Greece 2 players
Panathinaikos F.C. players
Panathinaikos F.C. B players
Association football defenders
Footballers from Agrinio